Alson Skinner Clark (March 25, 1876 – March 23, 1949) was an American Impressionist painter best remembered for his landscapes. He was also a photographer, plein aire painter, art educator and muralist.

Early life and education 
On March 25, 1876, he was born in Chicago, Illinois to a wealthy family. He showed early artistic talent and by age 11 he was taking art classes at Art Institute of Chicago. His art education included training at the Académie Julian (1899). In addition he studied in the atelier of William Merritt Chase and Chase School of Art and Académie Carmen with James McNeill Whistler.

Career 
He spent much of his early career working in Paris, France and served in the United States Army as an aerial photographer during World War I. In the 1920s, he taught fine art at Occidental College, and by 1919 he was director of the Stickney Memorial Art School in Pasadena.

His memberships in arts organizations included the Pasadena Society of Artists and the California Art Club. His work was included in the Tonal Impressionism exhibition curated by Harry Muir Kurtzworth in 1937, along with the works of Frank Tenney Johnson, Frank Tolles Chamberlain, and Theodore Lukits which was held in the Los Angeles Art Association Gallery at the Los Angeles Public Library.

Murals 
In addition to landscape paintings, he painted murals for the Carthay Circle Theatre in Los Angeles, and the fire curtain of the Pasadena Playhouse, depicting a Spanish galleon in full sail.

A group of murals completed in 1929 can still be seen at the former 1st Trust & Savings Bank at 587 East Colorado Boulevard in Pasadena, California. The murals consist of four panels standing approximately ten feet in height, each depicting a major southern California industry: oil drilling, citrus farming, the movies, and shipping.

Personal life 
In 1898, he traveled to France and, in 1902, returned to the United States. In 1920, he married Atta Medora McMullin (1881–1962). Immediately after, he and his wife moved to the Arroyo Seco area in Pasadena, California.

On March 23, 1949, he died while painting in his studio in Pasadena, California. He was 72 years old. He is buried at Mountain View Cemetery in Altadena, California.

Publications

Selected paintings

See also 
Stickney Memorial Art School

References

External links

Alson Clark Fine Art Gallery of Images
 Clark @ California Art Books
 Alson Skinner Clark @ University Club of Pasadena
 Alson Clark Collection of Photographs (1289 photographs)
More works by Clark @ ArtNet

American muralists
American Impressionist painters
American landscape painters
1876 births
1949 deaths
Artists from Pasadena, California
Académie Julian alumni
Académie Carmen alumni
20th-century American painters
American male painters
20th-century American male artists